is a Japanese football player. He plays for FC Imabari.

Playing career
Misaki Uemura played for Júbilo Iwata from 2014 to 2015. In 2016, he moved to FC Imabari.

Club statistics
Updated to 20 February 2017.

References

External links
Profile at Jubilo Iwata

1991 births
Living people
University of Tsukuba alumni
Association football people from Mie Prefecture
Japanese footballers
J2 League players
Japan Football League players
Júbilo Iwata players
FC Imabari players
Association football midfielders